Acha or ACHA may refer to:

Acha, Coll, Scottish village
Acha (doll), a character in Namco's 1986 arcade game, Toy Pop
Acha (name), list of people with the name
Acha Mountain Fortress, an earthen fortress
General Acha, town in La Pampa Province, Argentina
American College Health Association
American Collegiate Hockey Association
A name for Digitaria exilis, a grass, a species of fonio

See also
Acha Dhin, 2015 Malayalam film